This is a list of flag bearers who have represented Spain at the Olympics.

Flag bearers carry the national flag of their country at the opening ceremony of the Olympic Games.

See also
Spain at the Olympics

References

Spain at the Olympics
Spain
Olympics